Olle Gunnar Westling (born 7 January 1945) is a Swedish former municipal civil servant and the father of Prince Daniel, Duke of Västergötland (the husband of Victoria, Crown Princess of Sweden). He is the grandfather of Princess Estelle, Duchess of Östergötland, and Prince Oscar, Duke of Skåne, who are the second and third in line of succession to the Swedish throne, respectively.

Westling’s father Anders Andersson (1900–1980) adopted the surname of Westling which was the maiden name of his mother Brita Westling (1868–1965). During 1965–66, he served as a soldier in the peacekeeping operation UNEF in Gaza.

Westling is of Forest Finnish descent and active in the Forest Finnish community.

Westling is a recipient of the 70th Birthday Badge Medal of King Carl XVI Gustaf (30 April 2016).

References 

1945 births
Swedish people of Forest Finnish descent
Living people
Swedish civil servants
Organ transplant donors